Sir Thomas Hare (28 March 1806 in England – 6 May 1891) was a British lawyer, MP and proponent of electoral reform. In particular he was the inventor of the Single Transferable Voting system, now used in many places in the world.

Life
He was born on 28 March 1806, was the only son of A Hare of Leigh, Dorset. 
On 14 November 1828 he was admitted a student of the Inner Temple, and was called to the bar on 22 November 1833. He practised in the chancery courts and from 1841 reported in Vice-chancellor Wigram's court.

He studied law, and was called to the Bar in November 1833 and published several works on judges' decisions. In 1853 he became Inspector of Charities and was later Assistant Commissioner on the Royal City Charities Commission, about which he published several books. Elected a Conservative Party Member of Parliament, he resigned from political office in 1846. He became a Peelite, and broke with the Conservatives, but did not wish to join the Liberal Party, preferring to maintain his independence.

Family
He married, first, in Dorsetshire on 7 August 1837, Mary, daughter of Thomas Samson of Kingston Russell. She died on 21 October 1855, and was buried in the churchyard of Brompton church. They had eight children. The eldest daughter, Marian, wife of the Rev. W. R. Andrews of Eastbourne, has written under the pseudonym of 'Christopher Hare;' the second daughter, Alice, married Professor Westlake. Hare married, secondly, on 4 April 1872, Eleanor Bowes Benson (1833–1890), second sister of Edward White Benson, archbishop of Canterbury, by whom he had issue Mary Eleanor (1874–1883).

Views
Hare was said to have been 'conspicuous for great industry – to have wide interests in life and clearness of intellectual vision'. He was a member of the London-based Political Economy Club and the British Dictionary of National Biography says of him:

Hare's energies were concentrated in an attempt to devise a system which would secure proportional representation of all classes in the United Kingdom, including minorities in the House of Commons and other electoral assemblies.

His original electoral system ideas included each voter casting a single preferential vote in an at-large district covering the entire United Kingdom. The electorate would be divided into similarly-sized groups each electing one representative.  Hare, in 1854, set the divisor as 654, based on the number of seats in the UK Parliament. He later changed this to seven or eight hundred separate voting blocks. 

His system at first had it that each voter would sign and check his vote. By 1873, however, he had adapted his ideas to take account of the secret vote. 

Under Hare's method, simply dividing the vote by the number of seats constituted the quota. This is what we now call the "Hare quota". Surplus votes (votes over and above the quota) were to be distributed 'at random'. (This whole-vote method of transferring surplus votes held by successful candidates is now used in the lower house in national elections in Ireland and Malta.)

Hare's famous original work Machinery of Representation appeared in 1857 (in two editions) and many editions of his equally famous Treatise on the Election of Representatives: Parliamentary and Municipal appeared between 1859 and 1873. In the preface to the fourth edition, he stated his belief that proportional representation would 'end the evils of corruption, violent discontent and restricted power of selection or voter choice'. A great deal of writing on that theory developed and several societies were formed worldwide for its adoption although Hare pointed out that his scheme was not meant to bear the title 'representation for minorities'. Moreover, he noted in the preface to his third edition a point that was to become a feature of Tasmanian politics:

Can it be supposed that the moment the electors are allowed a freedom of choice they will immediately be seized with a desire to vote for some distant candidate with whom they are unacquainted, rather than for those whom they know – who are near to them, whose speeches they have heard and who have personal recommendations to the favour and respect of the town and neighbourhood.

Finally, with the help of contemporaries such as John Stuart Mill and Catherine Helen Spence, Hare popularised the idea of proportional representation worldwide. The permanent recognition of his name in the Tasmanian system is perhaps appropriate despite little being left of his original proposals. His death in May 1891 occurred several years before the first use of proportional representation in Tasmania in 1897.

The former London headquarters of the Electoral Reform Society was named in his honour.

Systems 

Hare lends his name to the following:
 a system of proportional representation, also known as Single Transferable Vote (STV)
 a particular quota being used by STV, the Hare quota
 a seat allocation method, also known as the largest remainder method

The Single Transferable Vote method has been widely used for multiple-winner elections. While continuing to be the main method of elections in the Republic of Ireland and for some elections in Australia, it has been widely used in numerous corporations and organizations, and has been employed in local elections in a few jurisdictions of the United States. 2007 saw the reintroduction of STV in public elections on the British mainland in elections to Scottish local authorities.  STV had been used for elections to Parliament for some University Seats from 1918 to 1945 and from 1918 to 1929 for Scottish boards.

Mill described Hare's system as "the greatest improvement of which the system of representative government is susceptible; an improvement which…exactly meets and cures the grand, and what before seemed inherent, defect of the representative system".

Hare, not a mathematician, never subjected his STV system to a rigorous mathematical analysis.

Law reports 

Hare also obtained minor fame in an entirely different field: law reporting.

At a time when there were no official reports of judicial decisions, Hare published reports of key decisions of the courts to enable them to be used as precedents.  Two key judicial decisions, which are still frequently cited today, are reported only in Hare's Reports in Chancery:
 Henderson v Henderson (1843) 3 Hare 100, from which the rule known as "the rule in Henderson v Henderson" is derived.
 Foss v Harbottle (1843) 2 Hare 461, from which the rule known as "the rule in Foss v Harbottle" is derived, and which is still the cornerstone of minority shareholder rights in company law in common law legal systems over 160 years later.
The Hare law reports were published from 1841 to 1853.

Works 

 The machinery of representation (1857)
 A treatise on election of representatives, parliamentary and municipal (1859)
 The election of representatives parliamentary and municipal: a treatise (1865)

References 

Attribution

External links
 http://www.vladimir.izbirkom.ru/etc/vystuplenie_vn.pdf

See also
F.D. Parsons, Thomas Hare and Political Representation in Victorian Britain (Palgrave Macmillan, 2009)

Hare–Clark electoral system

1806 births
1891 deaths
British political scientists
Voting theorists
Single transferable vote